Harvey Abner Allen (October 17, 1818 – September 20, 1882) was an officer in the United States Army who served as the fourth commander of the Department of Alaska, from September 20, 1871 to January 3, 1873.

He graduated from West Point in 1841, and was assigned to the 2nd Artillery Regiment, serving with this unit for most of his career.

Allen died at his home in Schraalenburg, New Jersey (now Dumont, New Jersey) on September 20, 1882, and was buried in Green-Wood Cemetery in Brooklyn.

See also
Governors of Alaska

References

Service Profile

Sources

1818 births
1882 deaths
American military personnel of the Mexican–American War
Burials at Green-Wood Cemetery
Commanders of the Department of Alaska
People from Dumont, New Jersey
People of North Carolina in the American Civil War
Union Army officers
United States Army officers
United States Military Academy alumni
19th-century American politicians
Military personnel from New Jersey